Kelvin Michaúd Lewis (born April 12, 1988) is an American professional basketball player for SKN St. Pölten of the Austrian Basketball Superliga.

College career
Lewis played collegiately for Houston, helping them reach an NCAA Tournament berth for the first time in 18 years. He transferred to Houston from Auburn, where he spent his freshman year.  Prior to Auburn, Lewis played for North Crowley High School in Fort Worth, Texas, where he was a part of the Rivals 150 recruits, and also All-State first team selection.

Professional career
Lewis played for the Houston Rockets in the 2010 NBA Summer League. In August 2010, he signed with Kavala of Greece. He left Kavala before the start of the season. On November 2, 2010, he was drafted by the Texas Legends. On March 4, 2011, he was traded to the Rio Grande Valley Vipers. On November 2, 2011, he was re-acquired by the Vipers.

In August 2012, he signed with Solna Vikings of Sweden. In which he earned 2nd Team All-Basketligen honors. For the 2013–14 season he signed with Tampereen Pyrintö of Finland. He helped his team to win the Korisliiga, also was named Korisliiga Defensive Player of the Year.

After attending Mini Camp with the Orlando Magic, In July 2014 Lewis signed with BC Timișoara of Romania. They also won the Cup that season.

In the 2015–16 season he played with Kolossos Rodou in Greek A1.

Lewis returned to Tampereen Pyrintö in February 2017 and averaged 10.7 points in 12 games in the Korisliiga.

On October 22, 2017, Lewis tried out with the Santa Cruz Warriors. He was put on waivers on October 31 before playing any games for the Warriors.

On November 6, 2017, Lewis signed with Höttur of the Icelandic Úrvalsdeild karla, replacing Aaron Moss. On February 21, Höttur announced they had released Lewis to allow him to sign with Kauhajoki Karhu Basket in the Finnish Korisliiga. Despite his early exit, he led the Úrvalsdeild in scoring with 25.4 points per game in 14 games.

In May 2018, he helped Karhu win the Korisliiga championship.

References

External links
Finnish League profile
Eurobasket.com Profile
RealGM.com Profile

1988 births
Living people
American expatriate basketball people in Austria
American expatriate basketball people in Finland
American expatriate basketball people in Greece
American expatriate basketball people in Hungary
American expatriate basketball people in Iceland
American expatriate basketball people in Romania
American expatriate basketball people in Sweden
American men's basketball players
Auburn Tigers men's basketball players
Basketball players from Dallas
Guards (basketball)
Houston Cougars men's basketball players
Kolossos Rodou B.C. players
Rio Grande Valley Vipers players
Solna Vikings players
Soproni KC players
Tampereen Pyrintö players
Texas Legends players
Úrvalsdeild karla (basketball) players